"A Drunken Man's Praise of Sobriety" is a poem written by the Irish poet William Butler Yeats. It is featured as a song on the bonus disk of Elvis Costello's album Brutal Youth.

External links

Poetry by W. B. Yeats
Songs written by Elvis Costello